Gunnar Axel Arvid Nilsson (20 November 1948 – 20 October 1978) was a Swedish racing driver. Before entering Formula One, he won the 1975 British Formula 3 Championship.

Nilsson entered 32 Formula One Grand Prix races, qualifying for all of them. He won the 1977 Belgian Grand Prix at Zolder while driving for Team Lotus. After losing his Lotus seat, he signed for Arrows for 1978, but was later diagnosed with testicular cancer which meant he could not drive the car. However, he did compete in three International Race of Champions (IROC) races in 1977. He had two sixth-place finishes and a fifth-place finish.

As soon as the cancer was determined to be terminal, he created the Gunnar Nilsson Cancer Foundation. He died in October 1978.

Gunnar Nilsson is buried in Pålsjö cemetery in Helsingborg, Sweden, close to his parents Arvid and Elisabeth Nilsson.

Early years
Nilsson was the second son of a Helsingborg building contractor. He attended school in his home town and went into the service as a submarine radio officer in the Swedish Navy. After leaving the Navy, he studied engineering for four years at Stockholm University and gained a degree. It was hoped he would join the family business, but after eight months working as a supervisor in the construction industry; he left to start his own business.

Although his background and training was in construction, this held no attraction to the young Swede. Together with his associate, Dan Molim, they aimed to establish a transport business. This proved to be very successful and Nilsson continued to be a partner in the company, even when he became a full-time driver. He had seen the exploits of fellow Swedes; Ronnie Peterson and Reine Wisell and knew he wanted to be a racing driver.

Junior formulae
Nilsson began racing in national events in Sweden, in the late 1960s. It was 1972, when he acquired a RPB Formula Vee car and set forth to learn the trade. This first season in Formula Vee saw him race just ten times, and included one race win at Mantorp Park. At the age of 26, he decided to try his hand and raced in Formula Super Vee series in 1973, with Ecurie Bonnier. Driving a Lola T252 alongside his teammate Freddy Kottulinsky, he would learn many valuable lessons from this seasoned campaigner. In his first race though, Nilsson finished third, and after a string of good performances, he finished fifth in the championship. He was clearly good as he stepped up to Formula Two, and promptly finished fourth in the Norisring-Trophäe, at the Norisring, in a Team Pierre Robert entered GRD-Ford 273, mainly due to misfortunes of others. One of these lessons learnt was that if he wanted to race at the top and with the best, his next step would be in Formula Three. It was while racing at Nürburgring that he was approached by Västkust-Stugan, who offered sponsorship for 1974.

Formula Three/Formula Atlantic
With Västkust-Stugan help, a March 743 was acquired along with a Toyota engine. This would enable Nilsson to contest the Polifac Formula Three Championship. The results were as good as expected. He did score some second places, but victories and the season was punctuated by many spins and minor accidents. Nilsson did not go unnoticed and towards the middle of the season, he was given a drive with Team Västkuststugan, in their F2 March-BMW 732. Later in the season, he got another opportunity with Brian Lewis Racing, in their F2 March-BMW 732, where he did scored a fourth place in the second heat of the Preis von Baden-Württemberg und Hessen, at Hockenheim. This strong form in the German Formula Three series earned him a works March ride in the British series in 1975.

With the advantage of adequate pre-season testing and growing self-confidence, Nilsson scored his first F3 win in the season-opener at Thruxton. This was the catalyst for run of success that would see him win the B.A.R.C. BP Super Visco British F3 Championship, and included wins at Aintree, Ring Knutstorp, Snetterton and Silverstone. In winning the F3 support race at the British Grand Prix meeting, partly from winning the FOCA Trophy, he attracted the attention of Ted Moore of Rapid Movements Ltd., who signed Nilsson to race their Formula Atlantic Chevron. Gunnar had interspersed his success with some spectacular accidents, but with Ted Moore, he made no mistakes. Following a fourth place in his first Atlantic race, he would win the next five, four from pole position.

His F3 and Formula Atlantic performances earned him a test in a Formula One car, driving a Williams FW03 at Goodwood at the end of the 1975 season. He impressed and was offered a contract for 1976, but turned it down in favour of an F2 drive with March which did not require a budget. However, after just one Grand Prix for Lotus, Nilsson's countryman Peterson decided he wanted to drive for March in Formula One. As part of this deal, March offered Nilsson to Lotus, where he joined Bob Evans, another new signing in the team to help develop their new car, Lotus 77.

Grand Prix years
In all his Grands Prix, Nilsson only drove for Colin Chapman and his Team Lotus. He got his chance with the famous marque when Jacky Ickx and Ronnie Peterson abandoned ship when the Lotus 76 proved a disastrous replacement for the legendary Lotus 72. The replacement car for 1976, Lotus 77 was promising, meanwhile the team was undergoing big change at the time and Mario Andretti soon replaced Evans, the team was soon back on the way up, with Nilsson taking advantage of Andretti's experience.

Following Peterson's departure, Nilsson was thrown in at the deep end – racing the Lotus-Cosworth 77 in the South African Grand Prix. His debut was not an auspicious one; he qualified last of 25 drivers, in what was attributed to a bad car, which had caught fire during practice. The next was the non-championship, Race of Champions at Brands Hatch. This was more promising: he started from the second row of the grid and stormed into an immediate lead. However, his race only lasted to lap six, when the Cosworth DFV shed a plug lead. Before the other English non-championship race, the BRDC International Trophy, there was the small matter of the US GP West, around the street of Long Beach, California. He had survived a huge first turn accident, only for his rear suspension to break half a lap later, pitching him into the wall at 160 mph.

His debut season saw a podium finish at only his third Grand Prix, the Gran Premio de España. He also scored another impressive third place in the Grand Prix von Österreich, fifth in Germany and sixth in Japan, but the rest of the season was marred by accidents – in Belgium, Sweden, and Holland – and by car failures – in Monaco, France, England, and at Watkins Glen.

For 1977, Lotus retained Nilsson alongside Andretti, and the pair worked on developing the new ground-effect Lotus 78. After a slow start to the season, as Andretti took over his car for the Argentine Grand Prix, Nilsson really got going at Jarama with a 5th place. Two races later, he took a magnificent win at the rain-soaked Zolder. As the race progressed, and the track dried, Nilsson suffered from a vibrating wheel nut, therefore he made a stop to have a tyre change. On these new tyres, he drove around the outside of Niki Lauda's Ferrari with 20 laps to go, to take the lead and stayed ahead to take victory. With further good results at Dijon-Prenois (4th) and Silverstone (3rd) Nilsson climbed the Championship standings. Come Autumn, his performance was blighted by poor qualifying efforts and there was a sudden downturn in his performances, retiring from all the last seven rounds of the Grand Prix season.

His last appearance in a Formula One car, was at Fuji, where he drove an Imperial-liveried Lotus 78. Nilsson's last race was a lacklustre performance. Towards the end of the season, Nilsson's relationship with Chapman deteriorated to some extent, and with Peterson having signed to return to Team Lotus, he was on the way out at Lotus. By now, he was already experiencing symptoms of cancer. He would finish the season in eighth place with a total of twenty points. He might have scored more points but for a whole catalogue of accidents.

Nilsson signed to race for Arrows in 1978, in their debut season, but as it happened he did not have the health required to drive the car, and was forced to stand down before the first race. Rolf Stommelen was signed to replace him instead. As Nilsson got weaker, Andretti and Peterson raced to the World Championship.

Away from Formula One

Nilsson was versatile; having driven a BMW saloon in both the World Championship for Makes and European Touring Car Championship in 1976 and 1977. For 1977, he joined Dieter Quester in a BMW-Alpina to contest a limited-numbered of races, taking the BMW 3.0 CSL to victory at Salzburgring and Nürburgring.

Nilsson briefly sampled American style oval racing in the International Race of Champions series, scoring a fifth at Michigan in September 1977. A month later, he followed this with two sixth places at Riverside, and expressed plenty of enthusiasm for this form of racing.

Cancer
It was in December 1977, during a routine check-up with a London doctor when Nilsson was informed he had cancer. From then on, he experienced a rapid decline in health. At the Charing Cross Hospital, London, Nilsson was treated for his cancer by intensive radiotherapy. By July 1978, he was almost unrecognisable, having lost over 30 kg in weight and all his hair, but he still talked of a possible comeback. But the cancer had spread to his lymph nodes.

After resigning from Arrows, he dedicated his remaining months on founding and running the Gunnar Nilsson Cancer Foundation, linked to Charing Cross Hospital, declining pain-killing drugs so he could work as long as possible. His death came just five weeks after that of fellow Swede, rival and friend, Ronnie Peterson, who died from complications to injuries suffered in a crash at Monza. Peterson's death deeply affected Nilsson, who attended the funeral. He returned to the Charing Cross hospital where five weeks later, on 20 October 1978, he died due to his testicular cancer.

According to his obituary in The Times, "His rare talent had taken him swiftly to the top as No. 2 to Mario Andretti" "[and] he was perhaps the most naturally gifted of the new generation of grands prix drivers".

Personality
Those who knew Nilsson described him as a warm, energetic character with a love of life. His enthusiasm and confidence made him naturally persuasive, which F3 teammate Alex Ribeiro attributed to helping him progress in his early career. Even in later years as his condition worsened in hospital, he was an entertaining character to medical staff and convinced them to break certain rules for him, such as placing a telephone in his room.

Despite this outwardly friendly persona, Nilsson's true character was complex. He could become quite solitary and would sometimes detach himself from social situations, so that few people became truly close to him. His contemporaries attributed this to the lack of a father figure in his life, Nilsson's father having died when he was young.

Nilsson grew particularly close to Danny Sullivan after racing together in F3, eventually sharing a flat in London. The friendship continued and Sullivan was among those attending to his increasing needs toward the end of his life. He formed a strong student/teacher relationship with Lotus teammate Mario Andretti, who regarded Nilsson as his first true friend among racing drivers. He learnt from Andretti during their two years together, but inevitably felt the need to establish himself as a driver in his own right – this played a part in his decision to sign with Arrows for 1978.

Racing record

Career summary

Complete Formula One World Championship results
(key) (Races in italics indicate fastest lap)

Formula One non-championship results
(key) (Races in bold indicate pole position)
(Races in italics indicate fastest lap)

Complete European Formula Two Championship results
(key) (Races in bold indicate pole position; races in italics indicate fastest lap)

International Race of Champions
(key) (Bold – Pole position. * – Most laps led.)

References

Further reading
Fredrik af Petersens. The Viking Drivers: Gunnar Nilsson and Ronnie Peterson. William Kimber & Co Ltd. .

External links

Gunnar Nilsson article on The Speed Blog
The Gunnar Nilsson Cancer Foundation

1948 births
1978 deaths
Sportspeople from Helsingborg
Deaths from testicular cancer
Swedish racing drivers
Formula One race winners
International Race of Champions drivers
Swedish Formula One drivers
Team Lotus Formula One drivers
European Formula Two Championship drivers
British Formula Three Championship drivers
Deaths from cancer in England
World Sportscar Championship drivers